Trimethylsilanol (TMS) is an organosilicon compound with the formula (CH3)3SiOH.  The Si centre bears three methyl groups and one hydroxyl group. It is a colourless volatile liquid.

Occurrence
TMS is a contaminant in the atmospheres of spacecraft, where it arises from the degradation of silicone-based materials. Specifically, it is the volatile product from the hydrolysis of polydimethylsiloxane, which are generally terminated with trimethylsilyl groups:
(CH3)3SiO[Si(CH3)2O]nR  + H2O  →  (CH3)3SiOH  +  HO[Si(CH3)2O]nR

TMS and related volatile siloxanes are formed by hydrolysis of silicones-based containing materials, which are found in detergents and cosmetic products.

Traces of trimethylsilanol, together with other volatile siloxanes, are present in biogas and landfill gas, again resulting from the degradation of silicones. As their combustion forms particles of silicates and microcrystalline quartz, which cause abrasion of combustion engine parts, they pose problems for the use of such gases in combustion engines.

Production
Trimethylsilanol is accessible by weakly basic hydrolysis of chlorotrimethylsilane, since the dimerization can thus be avoided. Trimethylsilanol can also be obtained by the basic hydrolysis of hexamethyldisiloxane.

Trimethylsilanol cannot be produced by simple hydrolysis of chlorotrimethylsilane as this reaction leads to the etherification product hexamethyldisiloxane, because of the by-product hydrochloric acid.

Reactions 
Trimethylsilanol is a weak acid with a pKa value of 11. The acidity is comparable to that of orthosilicic acid, but much higher than the one of alcohols like tert-butanol (pKa 19). Deprotonation with sodium hydroxide gives sodium trimethylsiloxide.

TMS reacts with the silanol groups (R3SiOH) giving silyl ethers.

Structure
In terms of its structure, the molecule is tetrahedral.  The compound forms monoclinic crystals.

Additional properties
The heat of evaporation is 45.64 kJ·mol−1, the evaporation entropy 123 J·K−1·mol−1. The vapor pressure function according to Antoine is obtained as log10(P/1bar) = A − B/(T + C) (P in bar, T in K) with A = 5.44591, B = 1767.766K and C = −44.888K in a temperature range from 291K to 358K. Below the melting point at −4.5 °C, The 1H NMR in CDCl3 shows a singlet at δ=0.14 ppm.

Bioactivity
Like other silanols, trimethylsilanol exhibits antimicrobial properties.

References

Silanols
Trimethylsilyl compounds